Mats Moraing was the defending champion but lost in the second round to Botic van de Zandschulp.

Tallon Griekspoor won the title after defeating van de Zandschulp 6–1, 3–6, 6–1 in the final.

Seeds

Draw

Finals

Top half

Bottom half

References

External links
Main draw
Qualifying draw

Dutch Open - 1
2021 Singles